The Organic Law of Village Committees of the People's Republic of China consists of 30 articles about self-governance, self-education and elections in Chinese villages.

References 

 Articles in English: http://www.china.org.cn/english/government/207279.htm
 Articles in Chinese: http://www.cecc.gov/pages/selectLaws/laws/organicLawVillComm.php

See also 
 Chinese law
 National People's Congress

Chinese law
Local government in China